Konar-e Khoshk (also Romanized as Konār-e Khoshk and Konār Khoshk) is a village in Famur Rural District, Jereh and Baladeh District, Kazerun County, Fars Province, Iran. At the 2006 census, its population was 293, in 59 families.

References 

Populated places in Kazerun County